The 2012 Black-Eyed Susan Stakes was the 88th running of the Black-Eyed Susan Stakes. The race took place in Baltimore, Maryland on May 18, 2012, and was televised in the United States on the NBC Sports Network.  Ridden by jockey John R. Velazquez, In Lingerie won the race by one and one quarter lengths over runner-up Disposablepleasure. Approximate post time on the Friday evening before the Preakness Stakes was 4:46 p.m. Eastern Time and the race was run for a purse of $300,000. The race was run over a fast track in a final time of 1:52.07. The Maryland Jockey Club reported total attendance of 32,473. The attendance at Pimlico Race Course that day was a record crowd for Black-Eyed Susan Stakes Day.

Payout 

The 88th Black-Eyed Susan Stakes Payout Schedule

$2 Exacta:  (7–2) paid   $61.80

$2 Trifecta:  (7–2–8) paid   $423.80

$1 Superfecta:  (7–2–8–6) paid   $601.20

The full chart 

 Winning Breeder: Colts Neck Stables; (KY)  
 Final Time: 1:52.07
 Track Condition: Fast
 Total Attendance: 32,473

See also 
 2012 Preakness Stakes
 Black-Eyed Susan Stakes Stakes "top three finishers" and # of starters

References

External links 
 Official Black-Eyed Susan Stakes website
 Official Preakness website

2012 in horse racing
Horse races in Maryland
2012 in American sports
2012 in sports in Maryland
Black-Eyed Susan Stakes